Antoninho  is a nickname. Notable people with this name include the following people.

Antoninho, (1921 – 1973), Brazilian footballer born as Antônio Fernandes
Antoninho (footballer) (born 1939), Brazilian footballer born as Benedicto Antonio Angeli
Antoninho Travadinha, professional name of António Vicente Lopes (d. 1987), Cape Verdean musician

See also

Antonino (name)